Bethel Bible Seminary, Hong Kong
 Bethel Seminary, Bethel University (Minnesota)
 Bethel Seminary, Stockholm, Sweden